is a Japanese footballer who plays for JEF United Chiba. His regular playing position is right full-back.

Career

After graduating from Maebashi Ikuei High School, with whom he won the All Japan High School Soccer Tournament, Matsuda signed for Gamba Osaka ahead of the 2018 J1 League season.   He debuted for Gamba's Under-23 side in week 2 of the 2018 J3 League, coming on as a 58th-minute substitute for Yuto Mori in a 4-1 defeat away to Kagoshima United. 

Matsuda played a total of 24 games, including 23 starts, in his first season of senior football to help Gamba U-23 finish 6th in the final standings.   He didn't feature in any of Gamba's top team's matches but was named on the substitutes bench twice, once in the J.League and once in the J.League Cup.

Career statistics

Last update: 2 December 2018

Reserves performance

Last Updated: 2 December 2018

References

External links

1999 births
Living people
Association football people from Gunma Prefecture
Japanese footballers
J1 League players
J3 League players
Gamba Osaka players
Gamba Osaka U-23 players
Association football defenders
Zweigen Kanazawa players